FC Dynamo Vologda is a Russian football club from Vologda, founded on March 3, 1926 and competing professionally since 1966. They currently play in the Second League.

History
It was called FC Lokomotiv Vologda until 1966. After 2011 season, it was relegated from the Russian Second Division. 
The highest level it ever achieved was Russian First Division, where it played in 1992 and 1993.

Current squad
As of 22 February 2023, according to the Second League website.

Personnel

External links
Official website
Official VK

Association football clubs established in 1926
Football clubs in Russia
Sport in Vologda
1926 establishments in Russia